Sir Gustav Victor Joseph Nossal  (born 4 June 1931) is an Austrian-born Australian research biologist. He is famous for his contributions to the fields of antibody formation and immunological tolerance.

Early life and education
Nossal's family was from Vienna, Austria. He was born four weeks prematurely in Bad Ischl while his mother was on holiday. His family left their home town of Vienna for Australia in 1939 following Nazi Germany's annexation of Austria. As his father's grandparents were Jewish, he was also considered Jewish and at risk of being sent to concentration camps. In an interview with Adam Spencer, Nossal noted that his father was not a professing Jew but of Jewish ethnicity as he had been baptised a Roman Catholic as a child. Nossal remarked that his father "therefore thought that he would be somewhat protected from the Holocaust-type predicament. Of course, he hadn't properly read Mein Kampf. It was all spelt out there: if your four grandparents were Jewish, then you were Jewish." He was baptised and remains a practising Roman Catholic.

Nossal showed interest in medicine and wanted to become a doctor since the age of seven. When he first attended school in Australia, Nossal spoke no English
but he graduated from St Aloysius' College in 1947
as the dux of the college. In 1948, he entered the Sydney Medical School, graduating later with first-class honours from the University of Sydney. At the age of 26, he left his job in Sydney and moved to Melbourne to work with Macfarlane Burnet in medical science at the Walter and Eliza Hall Institute of Medical Research and gained his PhD degree at the University of Melbourne in 1960.

Religious beliefs
On describing his views on religion Nossal said:

Career
Following the retirement of Macfarlane Burnet in 1965, at the age of 35 Nossal became director of Walter and Eliza Hall Institute of Medical Research, a position that he kept until 1996.  In parallel, he was Professor of Medical Biology at the University of Melbourne. Nossal's research is in fundamental immunology, in the field of "antibody formation and immunological tolerance". He has written five books and 530 scientific articles in this and related fields.

Nossal has been President (1970-1973) of the 30,000-member world body of immunology, the International Union of Immunological Societies; President of the Australian Academy of Science (1994-1998); a member of the Prime Minister's Science, Engineering and Innovation Council (PMSEIC) (1989 to 1998); and Chairman of the Victorian Health Promotion Foundation (1987-1996). He has been chairman of the committee overseeing the World Health Organization's Vaccines and Biologicals Program (1993-2002) and Chairman of the Strategic Advisory Council of the Bill & Melinda Gates Foundation Children's Vaccine Program (1998-2003). He was Deputy Chairman of the Council for Aboriginal Reconciliation from 1998 to 2000. He is Chairman of the Advisory Committee of the Global Foundation, The purpose of the foundation is to "encourage Australia’s sustainable national development in a global context." Sir Gustav is a member of the Patrons Council of the Epilepsy Foundation of Victoria and of the advisory board of the Health Impact Fund.

Personal life
Nossal is married to Lyn whom he met and later married on completion of his medical course at the University of Sydney. Together, they have four children and nine grandchildren.

Awards and recognition
1964 - Royal Society of Victoria Medal for Excellence in Scientific Research
1967 – Fellow of the Australian Academy of Science (FAA)
1969 – Phi Beta Kappa Award in Science
1969 – SSI Honorary Member
1970 – Emil von Behring Prize
1970 – Commander of the Order of the British Empire (CBE) for his contribution to medical research
 1977 – Knighted for his ground-breaking work in immunology
 1979 – Macfarlane Burnet Medal and Lecture by the Australian Academy of Science
 1980 – Foreign Fellow of the Indian National Science Academy
 1981 – Fellow of the Australian Academy of Technological Sciences and Engineering (FTSE)
 1982 – Awarded the ANZAAS Medal
 1982 – Fellow of the Royal Society (FRS)
1982 – Rostrum Award of Merit, for excellence in the art of public speaking over a considerable period and his demonstration of an effective contribution to society through the spoken word
 1983 – Honorary Fellow of the Royal Society of Edinburgh (HonFRSE)
 1989 – Companion of the Order of Australia (AC) for his service to medicine, to science and to the community
 1990 – Albert Einstein World Award of Science
 1994 – James Cook Medal
 1996 – Koch Gold Medal, the prize being awarded for prizes for major advances in biomedical sciences, particularly in the fields of microbiology and immunology.
 1996 – Fellow of the Royal Society of Victoria (FRSV)
 1997 – Listed as one of the 100 Australians identified as Australia's Living National Treasures
 2000 – Australian of the Year
 2001 – Centenary Medal for distinguished service to the study of antibody formation and immunological tolerance
 2002 – Featured on an Australian postage stamp
 2006 – Honorary member of the Monash University Golden Key Society
 2007 – The Nossal Institute for Global Health at the University of Melbourne was named in honour of Nossal
 2009 – Nossal High School, located at the Berwick campus of Monash University, is named in honour of Nossal
 2010 – Inaugural Monash Medal as an Outstanding Australian for his contribution to the Australian community and beyond
 2012 – Monash University Faculty of Medicine, Nursing and Health Sciences Lifetime Achievement Award
 Foreign Member of the Korean Academy of Science and Technology

See also
 List of Australian of the Year Award recipients

References

External links
 Short biography
 Gustav Nossal – Virology Down Under
 1987 interview and 1998 interview on the Australian Academy of Science website.
 The Global Alliance for Vaccines and Immunization—a millennial challenge
 Liz Cincotta. "Passage to Australia". The Age, 19 June 2008.
 Video  of Gustav Nossal lecture on The 50-Year Revolution in Global Public Health, Sydney University, July 2008

Living people
1931 births
Albert Einstein World Award of Science Laureates
Academic staff of the University of Melbourne
Australian biologists
Australian Commanders of the Order of the British Empire
Australian immunologists
Australian Knights Bachelor
Australian of the Year Award winners
Companions of the Order of Australia
Fellows of the Australian Academy of Science
Australian Fellows of the Royal Society
Members of the French Academy of Sciences
Foreign associates of the National Academy of Sciences
Fellows of the Australian Academy of Technological Sciences and Engineering
Foreign Fellows of the Indian National Science Academy
People from Bad Ischl
Jewish emigrants from Austria to Australia after the Anschluss
Recipients of the Centenary Medal
Sydney Medical School alumni
WEHI alumni
Australian Roman Catholics
People educated at St Aloysius' College (Sydney)
Presidents of the Australian Academy of Science
Australian republicans